Naranjito is a district of the Quepos canton, in the Puntarenas province of Costa Rica.

History 
Naranjito was created on 11 August 1971 by Decreto 1904-G.

Geography 
Naranjito has an area of  km² and an elevation of  metres.

Demographics 

For the 2011 census, Naranjito had a population of  inhabitants.

Transportation

Road transportation 
The district is covered by the following road routes:
 National Route 616

References 

Districts of Puntarenas Province
Populated places in Puntarenas Province